Óli Mittún (born 10 June 2005) is a Faroese handball player for IK Sävehof.

He participated at the 2022 European U-18 Championship and the 2022 European U-20 Championship

Individual awards 

 MVP at the 2022 European U-18 Championship
 Top scorer at the 2022 European U-18 Championship (80 goals)

Personal life 
He is the cousin of handball player Elias Ellefsen á Skipagøtu, also playing for IK Sävehof. He is also cousin of handball player Roi Ellefsen á Skipagøtu. His older brother Pauli Mittún is also a handball player.

References

2005 births
Living people
Faroese male handball players
Expatriate handball players
IK Sävehof players